All Things Bright and Beautiful is the third studio album by the American electronica project Owl City. It was released on June 14, 2011, by Universal Republic Records. Despite receiving mixed critical reviews, it became a commercial success, reaching No. 6 on the Billboard 200.

The album's title is based on the hymn of the same name.

Writing and development
The album sees Adam Young continuing his synth-pop stylings while also experimenting with indie rock, folk, European trance on "Galaxies" and rap on "Alligator Sky". Guest musicians on the album include Shawn Chrystopher, Matthew Thiessen, Lights, Breanne Düren and Adam Young's mother, Joan Young.

The album was originally planned to have a worldwide release date of May 24, 2011. It was then changed to May 17. On April 6, however, Young posted on his official site that the release date had been bumped to June 14, 2011. He stated that the reason for this was, "In an attempt to better connect the dots and ensure that every cloud in the sky is stitched together with its own special silver lining", and "with school finally out for the summer, it'll be a perfect time to sit back and watch the fireworks." Along with this post were previews of four tracks from the new album, each being 1:30 long. The previews posted were of "Alligator Sky" (featuring Shawn Chrystopher), "Deer in the Headlights", "Galaxies" and "Dreams Don't Turn to Dust".

On the introductory track to "Galaxies", entitled "January 28, 1986" (the date of the Space Shuttle Challenger disaster), Ronald Reagan's State of the Union speech is sampled.

In an interview with Us Weekly on June 15, 2011, a day after the album's release, Young revealed that the album originally intended to have Taylor Swift as another guest, but was unable to do so, due to her being busy outside of the United States at the time. He also added about having her in a specific song, which may or may not be one of the songs in the album.

Singles
The first official single released from the album was "Alligator Sky", which features Californian rapper Shawn Chrystopher, was released on April 12, 2011. There are currently four versions of the track. The first version features Shawn Chrystopher, the second features different lyrics and Chrystopher's vocals are omitted, a third version featuring Atlanta rapper B.o.B leaked online, and finally a fourth version featuring vocals from Big Boi of Atlanta hip hop duo Outkast also leaked onto the internet.

On April 19, 2011, "Galaxies" was released as the second single from the album, and was made available for purchase and download on iTunes. The song peaked at number 39 on the US Hot Christian Songs chart, surpassing "Fireflies", which peaked at No. 44 (2010). It has since then re-entered the chart at No. 48 in the week of September 24, 2011.

An exclusive single, "Lonely Lullaby", was released to all members of Owl City Galaxy, a club that you automatically became a part of when you pre-ordered the album. The song mentions an "Annmarie" many times, a reference to Adam Young's ex-girlfriend, Annmarie Monson. This song, however, is not actually part of the album. The app was discontinued in mid-2013. The song later was released as a single on July 19, 2011, making it officially available to people outside of Owl City Galaxy. The song has been met with some commercial success, peaking at number 12 on the Billboard Bubbling Under Hot 100.

"Angels" was released on September 20, 2011 as the fourth and final single from the album. The song was serviced to Christian radio stations that same day.

Promotional singles
"Deer in the Headlights" was released digitally on May 23, 2011. The single was announced in a different way than what is considered traditional. Starting May 16, 2011, every day of that week part of the song would be added to the sneak peek. It was originally just called "New Song", and fans had to guess the new song. The first part of the song to be released were the drums, followed by the addition of bass, guitar, synthesizer, and vocals over the next four days. On the final day, the title for the song was announced. Electropop artist Lights made an appearance in the music video. 

Young confirmed that "Dreams Don't Turn to Dust" would be the next single from the album, although it was uncertain if it would be released in the UK only.

Critical reception

All Things Bright and Beautiful has received mixed reviews, gaining a 49/100 score from Metacritic, an 8/10 score from IGN and a score of 5/10 from Spin.Allmusic writer Andrew Leahey praised the sound of the disc, calling Young "a top-notch producer; his music pops and fizzes with glitchy electronics, which he splashes throughout the track list like effervescent paint, and the songs all have an otherworldly sound about them, as though they were born in space and sent back to Earth in futuristic clothing." However, he derided the actual musical content, saying "there’s no bite to Young’s sugary confections, no break from the electro-pop treacle that he churns out like an emo Willy Wonka."  He ended up awarding the disc 2.5 stars of a possible 5.

Commercial performance
In the US, the album debuted at No. 6 on the Billboard 200 chart selling 48,000 copies. In Germany, the album only reached No. 69 for one week before falling off the chart, charting lower than Ocean Eyes, which charted for 9 weeks and peaked at No. 7. In the United Kingdom, the album reached No. 30 in the midweek chart on June 23, only to fall off before the official chart later in the week. In Canada, All Things Bright and Beautiful peaked at number seven. To date, the album has sold around 120,000 copies in the US.

Track listing

Personnel
Owl City
 Adam Young – vocals, keyboards, piano, synthesizers, guitars, bass, drums, programming, percussion, glockenspiel, marimba, accordion, producer, engineer, art direction, audio mixer
Additional musicians and production
 Breanne Düren – additional vocals on track 5
 Shawn Chrystopher – additional vocals on track 10
 Lights – additional vocals on track 11
 Joan Young – backing vocals on track 9
 Matthew Thiessen – backing vocals on track 12
 Laura Musten – violin on tracks 4, 6, 10 & 13
 Hannah Schroeder – cello on tracks 6, 7, 10 & 13
 Daniel Jorgensen – vibraphone on tracks 4 & 7
 Steve Bursky – producer, management & hand claps on track 5
 Ted Jensen – mastering
 StudioAKT – art direction
 Jack Joseph Puig – audio mixer
 Joe Corey – audio mixer assistant

Charts

Weekly charts

Year-end charts

References

2011 albums
Owl City albums
Universal Republic Records albums